Grizzly Peak is a high and prominent mountain summit of the Collegiate Peaks in the Sawatch Range of the Rocky Mountains of North America.

Elevation
At one time, the peak's elevation was measured to be over 14,000 feet and was believed to be a fourteener, but more recent and accurate surveys have dropped it below that threshold.

Geology
The mountain is composed of  andesite lava flows and breccias of Oligocene age.

Historical names
Grizzly Mountain
Grizzly Peak

Other summits with same name
Grizzly Peak is not only the name of Colorado's highest thirteener, but the state has four other Grizzly Peaks plus one Grizzly Mountain on the list:

See also

List of mountain peaks of North America
List of mountain peaks of the United States
List of mountain peaks of Colorado

References

External links

 
 

Mountains of Colorado
Mountains of Chaffee County, Colorado
Mountains of Pitkin County, Colorado
North American 4000 m summits
Great Divide of North America